Season fourteen of the television program American Experience originally aired on the PBS network in the United States on September 30, 2001 and concluded on May 12, 2002. The season contained 14 new episodes and began with the sixth part of the miniseries New York: A Documentary Film, "City of Tomorrow".

Episodes

References

2001 American television seasons
2002 American television seasons
American Experience